The 1925 Wabash Little Giants football team was an American football team that represented Wabash College as an independent during the 1925 college football season. In its seventh season under head coach Robert E. Vaughan, Wabash compiled a 5–3–1 record. Its three losses were to Big Ten Conference opponents Minnesota, Iowa, and Illinois. One of its victories was against Big Ten opponent Purdue.

Schedule

References

Wabash
Wabash Little Giants football seasons
Wabash Little Giants football